Marius Bezykornovas (born 22 August 1976) is a Lithuanian footballer.

Club career

JK Narva Trans
In 2010, he joined Meistriliiga side JK Narva Trans and played his first match for the team on 9 March 2010.

International career
He made the national team debut on 14 February 1997 in a Friendly tournament against Poland.

References

External links
 
 Profile at FCTrans.ee 
 Profile at Futbolinis.lt
 Profile on Soccernet.ee 
 Profile at Eurofootball.lt 

Living people
1976 births
Lithuanian footballers
Lithuania international footballers
FBK Kaunas footballers
FK Žalgiris players
FK Atlantas players
FK Nevėžis players
FK Šilutė players
SK Blāzma players
JK Narva Trans players
People from Kybartai
FK Jonava players
Lithuanian football managers
FK Jonava managers
Association football midfielders
Lithuanian people of Russian descent
Expatriate footballers in Estonia
Meistriliiga players
Lithuanian expatriate footballers
Lithuanian expatriate sportspeople in Estonia